Carlos de la Torre Allariz (born 18 May 1966 in Marín, Pontevedra) is a retired Spanish long-distance runner who specialized in the 10,000 metres.

Achievements

Personal bests
5000 metres - 14:01.42 min (1994)
10,000 metres - 28:09.63 min (1994)

References
 
sports-reference

1966 births
Living people
Spanish male long-distance runners
Athletes (track and field) at the 1992 Summer Olympics
Athletes (track and field) at the 1996 Summer Olympics
Olympic athletes of Spain